Frank Davis Hammond (Oct. 12, 1921 - March 17, 2005) was an author of Christian related books, particularly on deliverance ministry. In 1980 Hammond founded 'The Children's Bread Ministry' with his wife (and sometimes coauthor) Ida Mae Hammond. Hammond was an alumnus of Baylor University and Southwestern Baptist Theological Seminary.

Teachings
Hammond taught that ethical issues such as resentment and gossiping – together with issues such as compulsive eating, forgetfulness, sexual problems, and mental illness – may be caused by demons requiring deliverance ministry, and that such individuals may require such deliverance. He and his wife Ida Mae have been called "perhaps the most influential practitioners of deliverance ministry." Their 1973 book Pigs in the Parlor: A Practical Guide to Deliverance is one of the most influential on the topic, and has sold over a million copies.

Hammond's books helped to transfer the ideas of deliverance ministry into the Catholic Charismatic Renewal, in particular the concept of demonic influence short of the demonic possession that requires exorcism by a priest.

Personal
Born in Terrell, TX in October 1921, he married Ida Mae Loden 
(also of Terrell) in 1948.

Bibliography
Overcoming Rejection (1987)
Soul Ties (1988)
Confronting Familiar Spirits: Counterfeits to the Holy Spirit (1988)
Promoted by God (1989)
Our Warfare - Against Demons and Territorial Spirits (1991)
Demons and Deliverance in the Ministry of Jesus (1991)
Forgiving Others: The Key to Healing & Deliverance (1995)
Manual for Childrens Deliverance (1996)
Marriage Bed (1999)
God Warns America (2000)
The Tales of Two Franks: Unusual Deliverance Experiences (2000, with Frank Marzullo)
The Father's Blessing (2001)
Repercussions from Sexual Sins (2002)
The Strongman of Unbelief (2002, with Dorman Duggan)
The Perils of Passivity (2004)
Saints at War (2012)

With Ida Mae Hammond
Pigs in the Parlor: A Practical Guide to Deliverance (1973)
Kingdom Living for the Family (1985)
The Breaking of Curses (1993)
Comfort for the Wounded Spirit (1994)

See also
 Spiritual warfare

References

American Christian writers
1921 births
2005 deaths
Baylor University alumni
Southwestern Baptist Theological Seminary alumni